Rajya Sabha elections were held on various dates in 1959, to elect members of the Rajya Sabha, Indian Parliament's upper chamber.

The following elections were held in the year 1959:

 Maharashtra - Khandubhai K Desai - INC ( ele 09/03/1959 term till 1964 )
 Orissa - Ghasiram Sandil - OTH ( ele 05/05/1959 term till 1960 )
 Bihar - Rajeshwar Prasad Narain Sinha - INC ( ele 12/10/1959 term till 1960 )
 Nominated  - Jairamdas Daulatram - NOM  ( ele 19/10/1959 term till 1964 )
 Nominated  - Sardar A N Panikkar - NOM  ( ele 25/08/1959 term till 1960 )
 Nominated  - Mohan Lal Saksena - NOM  ( ele 22/11/1959 term till 1964 )

References

1959 elections in India
1959